Colin John Duncan (born 5 August 1957) is an English former association footballer who as a midfielder. Born in Plymstock, he played for Reading, Oxford United, Gillingham and Aldershot in a twelve-year professional career. He subsequently played non-league football for Fleet Town and Basingstoke Town. After retiring from football, Duncan settled in Thatcham where he became a painter-decorator.

References

External links
 

1957 births
Living people
English footballers
Gillingham F.C. players
Reading F.C. players
Oxford United F.C. players
Aldershot F.C. players
Association football midfielders
English Football League players
Fleet Town F.C. players
Basingstoke Town F.C. players